Octave Dua (28 February 1882, Ghent - 8 March 1952, Brussels) was a Belgian operatic tenor.

Biography
He was born Leo van der Haegen on 28 February 1882 in Ghent. He had a successful career as a comprimario.

He made his professional debut at La Monnaie in 1907 as Jeník in The Bartered Bride. From 1915-1922 he sang for the Chicago Opera Association and from 1919-1921 he performed at the Metropolitan Opera.

He appeared in 1919 in Covent Garden in the British premiere of M. Ravel’s L'Heure espagnole.

He appeared on 30 December 1921 in the world premiere in Chicago of S. Prokofiev's The Love for Three Oranges singing the role of  Truffaldino.

In 1922 he had a tumor of the neck removed in Chicago, Illinois.

He was committed to the Royal Opera, London from 1924 to 1939.

He was also active as a stage manager in Brussels and Ghent.

He died on 8 March 1952 in Brussels.

References

1882 births
1952 deaths
Belgian operatic tenors
Musicians from Ghent
20th-century Belgian male opera singers